Area F was one of the eight district electoral areas (DEA) which existed in Belfast, Northern Ireland from 1973 to 1985. Containing the inner parts of west and south Belfast, the district elected six members to Belfast City Council and contained the wards of Clonard; Cromac; Donegall; Falls; Grosvenor; and Saint George's wards. Most of the DEA formed part of the Belfast West constituency, with a small part in Belfast South.

History
The area was created for the 1973 local government elections. It contained the whole of the former Saint George's ward, centred on the Sandy Row area. It also contained smaller sections of the former Cromac, Falls, Saint Anne's and Smithfield wards. It was abolished for the 1985 local government elections. The depopulated Falls and Grosvenor wards were merged to form a single Falls ward, which, together with Clonard, formed part of the new Lower Falls DEA. The Donegall ward, which was renamed Blackstaff in 1985, became part of the Balmoral DEA. The Cromac and Saint George's wards were merged to form the Shaftsbury ward, which became part of the new Laganbank DEA.

Results

1973

1977

1981

1984 by-election
The by-election was held after Flynn, the IRSP councillor, was disqualified for non-attendance. It was the second seat on Belfast City Council that Sinn Féin won, following a by-election win in Area D in June 1983.

References

Former District Electoral Areas of Belfast
1973 establishments in Northern Ireland
1985 disestablishments in Northern Ireland